Clancy Grandy (born December 27, 1990 in Burlington, Ontario) is a Canadian curler originally from Ontario. She currently skips her own team out of Vancouver, British Columbia.

Career

Juniors
Grandy's junior career was highlighted by winning the 2011 Pepsi Ontario Junior Curling Championships with teammates Sarah Wilkes, Laura Crocker and Lynn Kreviazuk, defeating Jasmin Thurston in the final. The team represented Ontario at the 2011 Canadian Junior Curling Championships, where the finished with a 5-7 record. 

Later that season, Grandy skipped the Guelph Gryphons University curling team at the 2011 CIS/CCA Curling Championships, finishing with a 2-5 record. Laura Crocker, her junior teammate won the event as the skip for the Wilfrid Laurier Golden Hawks. Grandy skipped Guelph at the 2012 CIS/CCA Curling Championships as well, finishing 3-4, with Crocker's Laurier rink winning again. After playing in university curling, Grandy would play on the college level at Humber College.

Women's
After juniors, Grandy would play lead for Laura Crocker's women's team. Crocker would move to Alberta in 2012, forcing the team to disband. Grandy played in the 2014 Canadian Mixed Doubles Curling Trials with teammate Patrick Janssen. After posting a 4–3 record in their group, they lost their first playoff game in the Round of 12. In 2014, Grandy formed her own women's rink with teammates Janet Murphy, Melissa Foster and Nicole Westlund. That season, Grandy would qualify for her first provincial women's championship, the 2015 Ontario Scotties Tournament of Hearts. The team had a successful week but lost the semi-final to Sherry Middaugh.

For the 2015–16 season, Grandy played third on team Allison Flaxey with Lynn Kreviazuk playing second and Morgan Court playing lead. The team qualified for the 2016 Ontario Scotties Tournament of Hearts, but finished with a 3–6 record. However, they did win a World Curling Tour event that season, winning the KW Fall Classic. The next season, Grandy won her first Grand Slam of Curling event, the 2016 WFG Masters. The team had enough points to qualify for the 2017 Ontario Scotties Tournament of Hearts through the CTRS Leaders, but they lost the tiebreaker to Cathy Auld 10–4. 

Team Flaxey qualified for the 2017 Canadian Olympic Curling Trials as they were ranked third on the CTRS standings for the 2016–17 season. At the trials, they finished in last place with a 1–7 record, only beating Julie Tippin in the final round robin draw. The team lost all three qualifiers at the 2018 Ontario Scotties Tournament of Hearts and did not qualify for the playoffs.

For the 2018–19 season, Grandy stayed with Kreviazuk and Court but would bring on Jacqueline Harrison at skip as Flaxey moved back to Manitoba. The team played in the 2018 National Grand Slam where they lost in the quarterfinals to Rachel Homan. At provincials, the team struggled and ended up missing the playoffs with a 3–4 record.

On April 2, 2020, it was announced that Grandy and Court would rejoin Flaxey and would bring on Kaitlyn Jones to skip them for the 2019–20 season. The team did not have a great season, failing to win any tour events and not qualifying for the provincial championship. The team disbanded after just one season.

Grandy competed at the 2021 Scotties Tournament of Hearts, her first Canadian women's curling championship, as alternate for the Tracy Fleury rink skipped by Chelsea Carey as Fleury elected to stay home due to family commitments and the ongoing COVID-19 pandemic in Canada. At the Hearts, Carey led the team to a 6–6 eighth place finish. Grandy played in one end of the tournament, the eighth end against Newfoundland and Labrador's Sarah Hill where they stole four en route to an 11–2 victory.

For the 2022–23 season, Grandy moved to Coquitlam, British Columbia and joined the Kayla MacMillan rink out of British Columbia as their new skip. The team also included Lindsay Dubue and Sarah Loken. In their first event, the team finished runner-up to Silvana Tirinzoni at the Summer Series.

Personal life
Grandy is employed as a fascial stretch therapist at Rebound Sport & Spine. She is currently in a relationship with Robin Brydone, and was previously married to fellow curler Patrick Janssen. She also coaches the Jaap van Dorp rink from the Netherlands.

Grand Slam record

References

External links

1990 births
Living people
Canadian women curlers
Curlers from Ontario
Sportspeople from Burlington, Ontario
Sportspeople from Clarington
People from Pickering, Ontario
21st-century Canadian women
Curlers from British Columbia
People from Coquitlam